Saint-Marc-sur-Couesnon (literally Saint-Marc on Couesnon) is a former commune in the Ille-et-Vilaine department in Brittany in northwestern France. On 1 January 2019, it was merged into the new commune Rives-du-Couesnon.

Geography

The neighboring communes are Saint-Hilaire-des-Landes, Saint-Sauveur-des-Landes, La Chapelle-Saint-Aubert, Saint-Jean-sur-Couesnon, Mézières-sur-Couesnon, and Saint-Ouen-des-Alleux.

Population
Inhabitants of Saint-Marc-sur-Couesnon are called médardais in French.

See also
Communes of the Ille-et-Vilaine department

References

External links

 Geography of Brittany
 The page of the commune on infobretagne.com
 

Former communes of Ille-et-Vilaine